Laura Anderson (born 23 April 1989) is a Scottish television personality. In 2018, she was the runner-up on the fourth series of Love Island. In 2022, she was a finalist on Celebrity Karaoke Club and is also set to appear on Celebs Go Dating.

Life and career
Anderson was born on 23 April 1989 in Stirling, Scotland to Barbara and David Anderson. Prior to appearing on television, she was an air hostess working for the airline Emirates. In 2018, Anderson became a contestant on the fourth series of Love Island. Throughout the series she was coupled up with Wes Nelson, Jack Fowler and Paul Knops, the latter of whom she reached the final with and finished as the runners-up, behind winners Dani Dyer and Jack Fincham. From 2019 to 2020, she presented the podcast Laura Anderson's First. In each episode, she spoke to people about their challenging experiences. In 2022, she was a contestant on the third series of Celebrity Karaoke Club. She joined the club on the first day and reached the final after surviving the bottom two twice. Anderson was previously in a relationship with Another Level singer Dane Bowers and resided with him in Dubai. Following their split in August 2022, Anderson signed up to appear on the eleventh series of Celebs Go Dating that same month and found love with former Hollyoaks and Footballers' Wives actor, Gary Lucy. In February 2023, Anderson announced her pregnancy with Lucy, while at the same time announcing the couple's separation.

Filmography

References

1989 births
Living people
Love Island (2015 TV series) contestants
Scottish television personalities